68th Regiment or 68th Infantry Regiment may refer to:

 68th (Durham) Regiment of Foot (Light Infantry), an infantry unit of the British Army 
 68th Armor Regiment, an armoured unit of the US Army
 68th Armoured Regiment (India), a armoured unit of the Indian Army

American Civil War
 68th Illinois Volunteer Infantry Regiment, a unit of the Union (Northern) Army 
 68th Indiana Infantry Regiment, a unit of the Union (Northern) Army 
 68th New York Volunteer Infantry Regiment, a unit of the Union (Northern) Army 
 68th Ohio Infantry, a unit of the Union (Northern) Army 
 68th Pennsylvania Infantry, a unit of the Union (Northern) Army

See also
 68th Division (disambiguation)